Bo Tommy Leonard "Bosse" Nilsson (born 18 August 1944 in Tjörnarp) is a Swedish football manager and former footballer (defender).

He played for Tjörnarps BoIF, IFK Hässleholm and Djurgårdens IF.

He coached IFK Hässleholm, Mjällby AIF, Helsingborgs IF, Silkeborg IF, Degerfors IF, Al Tawoon, West Riffa and Chengdu.

References 

1944 births
Living people
Swedish footballers
Allsvenskan players
Djurgårdens IF Fotboll players
Swedish football managers
Mjällby AIF managers
Helsingborgs IF managers
Degerfors IF managers
Association football defenders